Sanguansi Township is a rural township in Cili County, Hunan Province, People's Republic of China.

Administrative division
The township is divided into 26 villages, the following areas: Sanguansi Village, Miaoling Village, Yunshan Village, Zhuya Village, Sanping Village, Fengping Village, Shuangyu Village, Zhaigang Village, Shuangquan Village, Daquan Village, Shuanglong Village, Qingfeng Village, Shequan Village, Shuanggao Village, Qinglong Village, Yuanjiaping Village, Ganquan Village, Luotan Village, Shuangqiao Village, Yuanjiazhuang Village, Shuangya Village, Shuangping Village, Wuwangpo Village, Changling Village, Hujiaping Village, and Jiehe Village (三官寺村、苗岭村、云山村、朱垭村、三坪村、丰坪村、双峪村、寨岗村、双泉村、大泉村、双龙村、庆丰村、射泉村、双高村、青龙村、袁家坪村、甘泉村、罗潭村、双桥村、袁家庄村、双垭村、双坪村、吴王坡村、长岭村、胡家坪村、界河村).

References

Divisions of Cili County
Ethnic townships of the People's Republic of China